Durgabar Kayastha (1515–1560) was litterateur from Kamakhya, Kamrup. He was well known Manasa poet as well as an expert oja of 16th century.

His major works include Behula Upakhyana narrating story of Behula and Chand Sadagar. The ballads connected with this story been current in western Kamarupa and the rest of north Bengal long before the verses were reduced to writing by Sukavi Narayan in the thirteenth century and by Durgabar in the early part of the sixteenth century. The songs of Durgabar are known as Durgabari. Durgabar Kayastha rendered Madhava Kandali's Ramayana into lyrics and made new ones of his own, both totalling fiftyeight; and these songs were put to different classical ragas. Durgabar Kayastha composed the Ramayana in the lyrical style of composition to be sung by the Oja Pali.

See also
 Bakul Kayastha
 Bhusana Dvija

References

Kamrupi literary figures
16th-century Indian poets
Assamese-language poets
1515 births
1560 deaths
People from Kamrup district
Poets from Assam